The Legrand sisters may refer to twin Argentine actresses both born February 23, 1927:

Mirtha Legrand born Rosa María Juana Martínez Suárez
Silvia Legrand born Rosa Aurelia Martínez Suárez